Slopná is a village and municipality in Považská Bystrica District in the Trenčín Region of north-western Slovakia.

History
In historical records the village was first mentioned in 1277.

Geography
The municipality lies at an altitude of 310 metres and covers an area of 7.642 km2. It has a population of about 491 people.

References

External links

 
http://www.statistics.sk/mosmis/eng/run.html

Villages and municipalities in Považská Bystrica District